Heeron Ka Chor is a 1982 Indian Hindi-language action film directed by S. K. Kapoor, starring Ashok Kumar, Mithun Chakraborty, Bindiya Goswami, Shakti Kapoor, Madan Puri, Helen in pivotal roles. The music was composed by Sonik Omi.

Plot 
It is the story of a mastermind thief, who plans and executes as well as succeeds in the greatest diamond robbery of the country ever.

Cast 
 Ashok Kumar as Mr. Khanna
 Mithun Chakraborty as Mohan Khanna
 Bindiya Goswami as Geeta
 Shakti Kapoor as Rana
 Madan Puri as Danny
 Helen as Tina

Soundtrack

References

External links 
 
http://www.bollywoodhungama.com/movies/cast/4401/index.html

1982 films
1980s Hindi-language films
Indian action films
1982 action films